Guzmania claviformis is a plant species in the genus Guzmania. This species is native to Ecuador and Peru.

References

claviformis
Flora of Ecuador
Flora of Peru
Plants described in 1991